Jabe B. Alford was mayor of Madison, Wisconsin.

Biography
A native of Syracuse, New York, Alford was born on September 21, 1850. He moved to Madison in 1855. Alford died on September 10, 1927.

Career
Alford was mayor from 1895 to 1896. Previously, he was a member of the city council from 1890 to 1891. He was a Democrat.

References

1850 births
1927 deaths
Mayors of Madison, Wisconsin
Politicians from Syracuse, New York
Wisconsin city council members
Wisconsin Democrats